Andrew Charles Martin (18 May 1927 – 3 May 2003) was a British modern pentathlete. He competed at the 1948 Summer Olympics.

References

External links
 

1927 births
2003 deaths
British male modern pentathletes
Olympic modern pentathletes of Great Britain
Modern pentathletes at the 1948 Summer Olympics